Amtrak has operated most intercity passenger rail transportation in the United States since May 1, 1971. This list contains serious incidents – those with deaths or more than 20 injuries of passengers or railroad personnel – that have involved Amtrak trains. (It does not include most grade crossing accidents and trespasser strikes that did not cause significant injury aboard the trains.) All serious incidents involving Amtrak are investigated by the National Transportation Safety Board (NTSB); incidents with suspected criminal activity (notably a 1995 wreck in Arizona) are also investigated by the Federal Bureau of Investigation (FBI).

The most number of fatalities in a single incident was 47 in the Big Bayou Canot crash, when the Sunset Limited fell off a bridge that had been struck by a barge minutes before. Five other incidents have caused ten or more deaths: a 1987 collision with freight locomotives in Maryland, a 1971 derailment in Illinois, a 1996 collision with a commuter train in Maryland, a 1999 grade crossing accident in Illinois, and a 1977 grade crossing accident in Florida. A 1990 derailment and collision with a commuter train in Massachusetts caused 453 injuries but no deaths.

References 

 
Amtrak